The 1940–41 Western Kentucky State Teachers Hilltoppers men's basketball team represented Western Kentucky State Normal School and Teachers College (now known as Western Kentucky University) during the 1940-41 NCAA basketball season. The team was led by future Naismith Memorial Basketball Hall of Fame coach Edgar Diddle and All-American center Carlisle Towery.  The Hilltoppers won the Southern Intercollegiate Athletic Association championship.  Towery, Howard “Tip” Downing, and Wallace “Buck” Sydnor were selected to the All-SIAA team.

Schedule

|-
!colspan=6| 1941 Kentucky Intercollegiate Athletic Conference Tournament

|-
!colspan=6| 1941 Southern Intercollegiate Athletic Association Tournament

References

Western Kentucky Hilltoppers basketball seasons
Western Kentucky State Teachers
Western Kentucky State Teachers
Western Kentucky State Teachers